Baraftab-e Seyd Mohammad (also Romanized as Barāftāb-e Şeyd Moḩammad and Bar Āftāb-e Seyyed Moḩammad; also known as Bar Āftāb and Barāftāb Saiyid Muhammad Chinār) is a village in Kuhdasht-e Jonubi Rural District, in the Central District of Kuhdasht County, Lorestan Province, Iran. At the 2006 census, its population was 402, in 80 families.

References 

Towns and villages in Kuhdasht County